Lam Kok Meng (born 11 January 1949) is a Malaysian field hockey player. He competed in the men's tournament at the 1976 Summer Olympics.

References

External links
 

1949 births
Living people
Malaysian sportspeople of Chinese descent
Malaysian male field hockey players
Olympic field hockey players of Malaysia
Field hockey players at the 1976 Summer Olympics
Place of birth missing (living people)